Salem is a census-designated place (CDP) in Saline County, Arkansas, United States. Per the 2020 census, the population was 2,544. It is part of the Little Rock–North Little Rock–Conway Metropolitan Statistical Area.

Geography
Salem is located at  (34.629565, -92.561668).

According to the United States Census Bureau, the CDP has a total area of 3.2 square miles (8.4 km2), of which 3.2 square miles (8.2 km2) is land and 0.05 square mile (0.1 km2) (1.52%) is water.

Demographics

2020 census

Note: the US Census treats Hispanic/Latino as an ethnic category. This table excludes Latinos from the racial categories and assigns them to a separate category. Hispanics/Latinos can be of any race.

2000 Census
As of the census of 2000, there were 2,789 people, 1,069 households, and 857 families residing in the CDP. The racial makeup of the CDP was 98.03% White, 0.32% Black or African American, 0.47% Native American, 0.18% Asian, 0.36% from other races, and 0.65% from two or more races.  1.08% of the population were Hispanic or Latino of any race.

There were 1,069 households, out of which 34.8% had children under the age of 18 living with them, 68.8% were married couples living together, 8.0% had a female householder with no husband present, and 19.8% were non-families. 17.4% of all households were made up of individuals, and 5.5% had someone living alone who was 65 years of age or older.  The average household size was 2.61 and the average family size was 2.94.

In the CDP the population was spread out, with 24.7% under the age of 18, 8.0% from 18 to 24, 29.2% from 25 to 44, 27.5% from 45 to 64, and 10.5% who were 65 years of age or older.  The median age was 39 years. For every 100 females there were 99.9 males.  For every 100 females age 18 and over, there were 97.7 males.

The median income for a household in the CDP was $44,681, and the median income for a family was $52,216. Males had a median income of $33,207 versus $26,337 for females. The per capita income for the CDP was $21,301.  About 3.9% of families and 3.1% of the population were below the poverty line, including 6.9% of those under age 18 and none of those age 65 or over.

Education 
Public education for early childhood, elementary and secondary school students is provided by

 Benton School District, which leads to graduation from Benton High School.
 Bryant Public Schools, which leads to graduation from Bryant High School.

Notable person

Lanny Fite, Republican member of the Arkansas House of Representatives from Saline County

References

Census-designated places in Arkansas
Census-designated places in Saline County, Arkansas
Census-designated places in Little Rock–North Little Rock–Conway metropolitan area